F. M. Bailey may refer to:

 Frederick Manson Bailey (1827–1915), Australian botanist
 Frederick Marshman Bailey (1882–1967), British soldier and explorer

See also
Bailey (surname)